During the Israeli–Palestinian conflict, foreign war correspondents, professional journalists, and citizen journalists have been killed since the beginning of the conflict in 1948 or have died as a result of their reporting. Also included in a separate form are those journalists whose whereabouts are unknown or whose disappearance is a result of their reporting and the period of their disappearance, including those cases where it is unknown as to whether or not they are casualties.

UNESCO has documented 21 professional or citizen journalists who have died in Israel and the Occupied Palestinian Territory since 2002. The Committee to Protect Journalists has documented 25 journalists killed in Israel and the Occupied Palestinian Territory since 1992. As of May 2022, the United Nations Office for the Coordination of Humanitarian Affairs estimates 6,036 Palestinian fatalities and 272 Israeli fatalities as a result of the conflict since 2008.

Professional or citizen journalists/media activists killed in Israel and the Occupied Palestinian Territory

Professional or citizen journalists/media activists killed outside of Israel and the Occupied Palestinian Territory

Professional or citizen journalists/media activists wounded non-fatally

Professional journalists and citizen journalists/media activists who were missing and then freed

See also

 Israeli–Palestinian conflict
 Israel–Palestine relations
 Mass media in Israel
 Newspapers of Palestine
 List of Palestinian civilian casualties in the Second Intifada
 List of Israeli civilian casualties in the Second Intifada

References

External links
 UNESCO Observatory of Killed Journalists: Palestine
 Committee to Protect Journalists: Journalists and Media Workers Killed in Israel and the Occupied Palestinian Territory

 
journalists
Citizen journalism
Human rights abuses in the State of Palestine
Human rights abuses in Israel
Israeli-Palestinian conflict
Lists of mass media in Israel
Israeli-Palestinian conflict